James Graham Jenkins (July 18, 1834August 6, 1921) was an American lawyer and Judge.  He served twelve years as a judge of the United States Court of Appeals for the Seventh Circuit, appointed by President Grover Cleveland.  Prior to that, he had been a United States district judge for the Eastern District of Wisconsin.

Education and career

Born on July 18, 1834, in Saratoga Springs, New York, Jenkins read law in 1855. He entered private practice in New York City from 1855 to 1857. He continued private practice in Milwaukee, Wisconsin, from 1857 to 1888. He was city attorney of Milwaukee from 1863 to 1867. In 1879, he was the Democratic nominee for Governor of Wisconsin, but was defeated by incumbent William E. Smith.

Federal judicial service

Jenkins was nominated by President Grover Cleveland on June 19, 1888, to a seat on the United States District Court for the Eastern District of Wisconsin vacated by Judge Charles E. Dyer. He was confirmed by the United States Senate on July 2, 1888, and received his commission the same day. His service terminated on March 23, 1893, due to his elevation to the Seventh Circuit.

Jenkins was nominated by President Cleveland on March 20, 1893, to a joint seat on the United States Court of Appeals for the Seventh Circuit and the United States Circuit Courts for the Seventh Circuit vacated by Judge Walter Q. Gresham. He was confirmed by the Senate on March 23, 1893, and received his commission the same day. His service terminated on February 23, 1905, due to his retirement.

Later career and death

Following his retirement from the federal bench, Jenkins resumed private practice in Milwaukee from 1905 to 1908. He was Dean of Marquette University Law School from 1908 to 1913. He died on August 6, 1921, in Milwaukee.

Electoral history

| colspan="6" style="text-align:center;background-color: #e9e9e9;"| General Election, November 4, 1879

References

Sources
 

1834 births
1921 deaths
People from Saratoga Springs, New York
Lawyers from Milwaukee
Marquette University faculty
Judges of the United States District Court for the Eastern District of Wisconsin
Judges of the United States Court of Appeals for the Seventh Circuit
United States federal judges appointed by Grover Cleveland
19th-century American judges
New York (state) lawyers
Wisconsin lawyers
United States federal judges admitted to the practice of law by reading law